Lišov is a town in České Budějovice District in the South Bohemian Region of the Czech Republic. It has about 4,500 inhabitants.

Administrative parts
Villages of Červený Újezdec, Dolní Miletín, Dolní Slověnice, Horní Miletín, Horní Slověnice, Hrutov, Hůrky, Kolný, Levín, Lhotice, Velechvín and Vlkovice are administrative parts of Lišov. Vlkovice forms an exclave of the municipal territory.

Etymology
The name Lišov was probably derived from the personal name Lichý, meaning "Lichý's (settlement)". The personal name itself means "odd" in Czech, but in old Czech it also meant "dishonest, evil".

Geography

It lies in the Třeboň Basin. In addition to several smaller ponds, there is Dvořiště in the northeastern part of the territory, one of the largest ponds in the Czech Republic.

History
The first written mention of Lišov is from 1296. In 1400, it was first referred to as a market town.

Demographics

Sights

The most valuable building is the Schwarzenberg Hospital, built by Jan Adolf of Schwarzenberg in 1675–1676. Today it houses a museum, library and gallery.

The Church of Saint Wenceslaus was built in the second half of the 19th century. It replaced the old church. The Church of Saints Nicholas and Leonard in Dolní Slověnice is originally a Gothic church from the late 13th century. It was later baroque rebuilt.

A technical monument is Locus perennis or "eternal place", an obelisk with built-in levelling markings. It was established here as one of the seven fixed points of accurate levelling of the Austro-Hungarian surveying system for European measurements.

Notable people
Milan Sachs (1884–1968), Czech-Croatian opera conductor and composer
Milan Křížek (1926–2018), composer, music teacher and violinist

Twin towns – sister cities

Lišov is twinned with:
 Schüpfen, Switzerland
 Varmo, Italy

References

External links

Cities and towns in the Czech Republic
Populated places in České Budějovice District